The Concertación, officially the Concertación de Partidos por la Democracia, was a coalition of center-left political parties in Chile, founded in 1988. Presidential candidates under its banner won every election from when military rule ended in 1990 until the conservative candidate Sebastián Piñera won the Chilean presidential election in 2010. In 2013 it was replaced by New Majority coalition.

History 
In 1987 General Augusto Pinochet, the dictator of Chile, legalized political parties and called a plebiscite to determine whether or not he would remain in power after 1990. Several parties, including the Christian Democracy, the Socialist Party and the Radical Party, gathered in the Democratic Alliance (Alianza Democrática). In 1988, several more parties, including the Humanist Party, the Ecologist Party, the Social Democrats, and several Socialist Party splinter groups added their support, despite fears of election fraud by Pinochet, and the "Concertación de Partidos por el NO" ("Coalition of Parties for NO") was formed to campaign against the continuation of Pinochet's regime.

The parties and leaders that made the first Party Presidents' Council were:

During the election campaign, the Coalition organized a colorful and cheerful campaign under the slogan "La alegría ya viene" ("Joy is coming"). Some Socialist factions were the last to join, because they were reluctant to work in the plebiscite, fearing election fraud by Pinochet. On 5 October 1988, the "NO" vote won with a 54% majority, and a general election was called for 1989.

In that year, the coalition changed their name to Concertación de Partidos por la Democracia ("Concert of Parties for Democracy") and put forward Patricio Aylwin, the Christian Democrat leader, as a presidential candidate, as well as launching a common list for the parliamentary elections. In elections the following year, Aylwin won and the coalition gained the majority of votes in the Chamber of Deputies. However, in Chile's bicameral parliament, they had no majority in the Senate, a situation they found themselves in constantly for over 15 years. This forced them to negotiate all law projects with the right-wing parties, the Unión Demócrata Independiente (UDI) and Renovación Nacional (RN) (later coalesced into the Alliance for Chile).

In 1993, the coalition put forward the Christian Democrat senator Eduardo Frei Ruiz-Tagle as a presidential candidate. Frei was the son of Eduardo Frei Montalva, the founder of the Christian Democrat Party and himself a former President of Chile (1964–1970). Gaining 57% of the votes, he defeated to the right-wing candidate, Arturo Alessandri Besa, becoming the third Christian Democrat president, and the second Coalition president.

In the same year, the Humanist Party, the Christian Left, and the Greens left the Coalition, accusing it of betraying the purpose for which it was born. The Social Democrat Party and the Radical Party joined together to form the Social Democrat Radical Party, while the various former Socialist factions became part of the Socialist Party.

Frei's government faced two main problems: an economic crisis was raising the unemployment rate, and General Pinochet had been arrested in London. Both situations led the Coalition to fear defeat in the 1999 presidential elections.

In that year, the coalition had two possible candidates: the Christian Democrats' Andrés Zaldívar and the Socialists' Ricardo Lagos. Primary elections were held to decide between the two. Lagos won the vote, and went on to defeat the UDI's Joaquín Lavín in the presidential election. However, since he got a plurality as opposed to a majority of the votes, a runoff vote was held, the first in Chilean history, in which Lagos won with 51% of the votes.

In 2005, two candidates were again proposed: the Christian Democrats' Soledad Alvear, a former Minister of Foreign Affairs, and the Socialists' Michelle Bachelet, a former Minister of Defense. As before, the situation was to be resolved through a primary election. However, in May 2005, after months of internal disputes regarding her party's directives, Alvear withdrew from the presidential race, deciding instead to run for senator in Santiago. Bachelet therefore became the Coalition's candidate, and the second woman to run for Chilean President (the first being Communist leader Gladys Marín), competing with the UDI's Joaquín Lavín and RN's Sebastián Piñera.

On 11 December 2005, Bachelet won with 45% of the votes, but was forced to compete with Piñera in a runoff election. In the same month, the coalition won 51.25% of the votes in the parliamentary elections, gaining 20 seats in the Senate and 65 seats in the Chamber of Deputies. This gave them a majority in both Houses for the first time.

On 15 January 2006, the runoff was held. Bachelet won with nearly the 54% of the votes, becoming the first female president of Chile. She was also the fourth Coalition candidate and third Socialist to win.

Coalition presidents 
 Patricio Aylwin (1990–1994)
 Eduardo Frei Ruiz-Tagle (1994–2000)
 Ricardo Lagos (2000–2006)
 Michelle Bachelet (2006–2010)

See also 
 List of political parties in Chile
 Chilean transition to democracy
 New Majority

Notes

References

External links 
Official site

1988 establishments in Chile
Defunct left-wing political party alliances
Defunct political party alliances in Chile
Political parties established in 1988